Benjamín Száraz (born 9 March 1998) is a Slovak footballer who plays as a goalkeeper for MFK Zemplín Michalovce.

Career

FC DAC 1904 Dunajská Streda
Száraz made his Fortuna Liga debut for DAC against Ružomberok on 27 May 2017.

In February 2019, Száraz was loaned out to Gabčíkovo.

References

External links
 FC DAC 1904 Dunajská Streda official club profile
 FK Senica profile
  
 Futbalnet Profile
 Futbalsfz Profile

1998 births
Living people
Slovak footballers
Slovakia youth international footballers
Association football goalkeepers
FK Senica players
FC DAC 1904 Dunajská Streda players
ŠK 1923 Gabčíkovo players
MFK Zemplín Michalovce players
3. Liga (Slovakia) players
Slovak Super Liga players